Myriam Birger, known as "The little girl with hands of gold", is a French pianist.

Biography 
Born in Normandy, the French pianist Myriam Birger comes from a family of intellectuals and artists.

Her father, Dr Karol Birger, had left his native Poland as a young man to join the great Dr Albert Schweitzer with whom he worked closely in Africa for several years.

Myriam revealed her exceptional piano skills at a very early age.

Her mother having tried to persuade her son to start piano lessons, it appeared that his little sister, Myriam, aged six, needed no persuasion to sit at the piano: she was immediately drawn to the instrument, fascinated by its sound and so fell in love with it.

"Her hands are pure gold", said the first teacher of her little pupil, Louise Clavius-Marius, the wife of the French composer Tony Aubin.

And so, two years later, Myriam, a real child prodigy, gave her first public concert at the age of eight in the Concert Hall of the Conservatoire de Paris.

Guided by teachers and encouraged by her mother- a pianist and organist herself-Myriam entered the Conservatoire National Supérieur de Paris aged eleven only, in Lucette Descaves's class.

There she graduated top of her class and was awarded the First Prize in Piano at the age of thirteen, the youngest recipient ever in the institution, and gathered numerous prizes including in chamber music.

She then performed for the first time in the illustrious Théâtre des Champs-Elysées.

Aged fifteen, Myriam hit the headlines when she won a prestigious prize at the Long-Thibaud-Crespin Competition.

A year later, at the age of sixteen, she made a striking debut on television playing the second Chopin Concerto with orchestra.

On that occasion she was heard and noticed by the great pianist and musical genius Samson François

Impressed and moved by her special gift, he became her Master and her Mentor.

These exceptional encounter and teaching made a deep impression on the young pianist and remain a lasting influence.

Turning eighteen, Birger was invited by the American pianist Byron Janis to go and work with him and thus she spent a year in the USA.

Back in France, an atypical event introduced her to the French public at large:
The photo magazine Paris Match relayed the victory of "a young and beautiful pianist, Myriam Birger" in a popular radio quiz: Myriam had won a pretty sum answering a question about Beethoven, one of her favorite composers!
Following a radio show, she was invited to Luxembourg where she performed a full concert featuring an orchestra which was broadcast by RTL, the radio station.

Those years were also the times of meeting and sharing with other musicians such as François-René Duchâble who subsequently introduced her to Arthur Rubinstein.

Other invitations included a Mediterranean sea musical cruise with the greatest names in music, where she befriended the magnificent cellist Mstislav Rostropovich whose charismatic personality affected her deeply.

Rostropovich then introduced her to the famous French trumpet player Maurice André.

The latter invited Myriam to participate in Jacques Chancel's notorious TV show  where she met the tenor Ruggero Raimondi, the trumpet player Dizzie Gillespie and the singer-song writer Yves Duteil as well as other prestigious artists.

Then concerts and tours took her all over the world and Myriam was unanimously acclaimed and celebrated for her powerful interpretations, her special “touch” and her intense presence on stage.

Teaching also became part of her development as she is keen on transmitting her knowledge to the new generations.

With her musician friends Bruno Rigutto and Lucien Akoka she has taken part in the creation of the Maisons-Alfort Music Conservatory, a music school in the Val-de-Marne next to Paris, which is now a certified State school.

At the end of the eighties and after many years dedicated exclusively to her art, little by little she went away from the stage to question and explore her life in depth.

She started a family and became the mother of a little girl, Ornella.

She has since appeared on rare occasions, such as a recital at the salle Pleyel Concert Hall, sponsored by Bernard Arnault for LVMH, or a concert organized by the Paris Town Hall (mairie de Paris), broadcast and projected on a giant screen.

Thus Myriam Birger has matured beautifully and become an ever committed, international and responsible artist.

To this day, Myriam's wide repertoire includes numerous composers and allows her to interpret different styles and adapt to all musical forms.

In this spirit she has recently taken part in "A Dialogue of Civilizations through Music", an event organized by the Qatar Embassy and the Arab World Institute (IMA).

She has created an online music theory course.

References

External links 
 Official website

1951 births
Living people
People from Seine-Maritime
21st-century French women classical pianists